Surjit Singh Dhiman is an Indian politician and a member of Indian National Congress. In the 2017 Punjab Legislative Assembly election, he was elected as the member of the Punjab Legislative Assembly from Amargarh Assembly constituency.

In 2022, he was expelled from Congress for alleged anti party activities.

Member of Legislative Assembly 
Singh Dhiman represented the Amargarh between 2017-2022. He won the seat as a candidate of the Indian National Congress, beating the incumbent member of the Punjab Legislative Assembly  Iqbal Singh Jhundan of the Shiromani Akali Dal.

References

Living people
Punjab, India MLAs 2017–2022
Indian National Congress politicians
People from Punjab, India
Indian National Congress politicians from Punjab, India
Year of birth missing (living people)